Cal Stewart (b. 1856 Charlotte County, Virginia, d. December 7, 1919) was an American comedian and humorist who pioneered in vaudeville and early sound recordings.  He is best remembered for his comic monologues in which he played "Uncle Josh" Weathersby, a resident of a mythical New England farming town called "Pumpkin Center" or "Punkin Center", leading to a number of small towns across the U.S. adopting those names.

Born in Charlotte County, Virginia in 1856, Stewart spent his early life working in circuses, medicine shows and vaudeville to great acclaim as "Uncle Josh Weathersby from Way Down East".  It was on the road that he befriended Mark Twain and later Will Rogers, two men who shared similar wit in comedy.

Around 1897, Thomas Edison's studios hired him to cut several cylinder recordings of his famous speeches and songs.  They were well received by the public, and launched an entire series of recordings based on the Uncle Josh character.  Stewart's trademark on these recordings is the easily recognizable laugh that precedes his speeches.

Best-selling recordings included "Uncle Josh’s Arrival in New York" (1898), "I'm Old But I'm Awfully Tough (Laughing Song)" (1898), "Jim Lawson's Horse Trade With Deacon Witherspoon" (1901), "Uncle Josh's Huskin' Bee Dance" (1901), and "Uncle Josh Buys an Automobile" (1903). He wrote the song "Ticklish Reuben" in 1900.

Stewart continued recording on Edison, Columbia, Victor, and independent labels up until his death on December 7, 1919.  He also wrote two books based on his monologues and performed in theaters across America with his wife Rossini Vrionides and her brother and sister.

Stewart is represented on the 2007 compilation Actionable Offenses: Indecent Phonograph Recordings from the 1890s.

References

External links
 
 
 
Cal Stewart cylinder recordings, from the UCSB Cylinder Audio Archive at the University of California, Santa Barbara Library.
 Cal Stewart Fan Site (includes digitized version of his book)
 Cal Stewart recordings at the Discography of American Historical Recordings.
Researching Cal Stewart and 'Uncle Josh', part 1 - Patrick Feaster interviewed by Jerry Fabris on Thomas Edison's Attic radio program, WFMU, January 9, 2007.
Researching Cal Stewart and 'Uncle Josh', part 2 - Patrick Feaster interviewed by Jerry Fabris on Thomas Edison's Attic radio program, WFMU, January 23, 2007.

1856 births
1919 deaths
Vaudeville performers
Pioneer recording artists
Columbia Records artists
Victor Records artists
Edison Records artists
Pathé Records artists